Kehdingen was a fishing trawler that was built in 1929 as Volkswohl. She was renamed Kehdingen in 1938 and was requisitioned by the Kriegsmarine in 1939. She served until 1944 when she was scuttled off the east coast of Greenland.

Description
The ship was powered by a 4-cylinder two stroke, single cycle single action diesel engine rated at 209 nhp. It was manufactured by Deutsche Werke AG, Kiel. The engine drove a single screw propeller.

History
Volkswohl was built in 1929 as yard number 208 by Deutsche Werke AG, Kiel for the Nordsee Deutsche Hochsee Fischerei Bremen-Cuxhaven AG. She was launched on 23 March 1929 and completed in December 1929. Her port of registry was Cuxhaven and the Code Letters RHMJ were allocated. In 1933, she came under the ownership of the German Government and was placed under the management of Reichsministerium für Ernährung und Landwirtschaft. With the change of Code Letters in 1934, she was allocated the letters DIFL. In 1938, she was renamed Kehdingen.

In 1939, Kehdingen was requisitioned by the Kriegsmarine. She was converted to a weather ship and entered service as WBS 6 Kehdingen in 1942. On 1 September 1944, Kehdingen was intercepted in the Arctic ocean off Great Coldeyey Island, Greenland by the Greenland Patrol . Her crew destroyed secret paperwork, scuttled her and surrendered. An attempted attack on USCGC Northland by U-703 was unable to be made due to the ice.

References

1929 ships
Ships built in Kiel
Fishing vessels of Germany
World War II auxiliary ships of Germany
Weather ships
Maritime incidents in September 1944
World War II shipwrecks in the Arctic Ocean